Frederick Henry Harvey Ravenhill (25 July 1837 – 4 August 1897) was an English cricketer.  Ravenhill was a right-handed batsman.  He was born at Littlehampton, Sussex.

Ravenhill attended Pembroke College, Oxford, matriculating in 1856 and graduating B.A. in 1862, He made his first-class debut for Sussex against the Marylebone Cricket Club at the Royal Brunswick Ground, Hove in 1863.  In this match, Ravenhill was dismissed for a duck by George Wootton in Sussex's first-innings, while in their second-innings he wasn't required to bat.  He made a second first-class appearance for Sussex in 1867 against Kent at Ashford Road, Eastbourne.  Ravenhill scored 3 runs in Sussex's first-innings, before he was dismissed by Bob Lipscomb, while in their second-innings he was dismissed by Edgar Willsher for 7 runs.

He died at Hove, Sussex on 4 August 1897.  His brother, Harry, and brother-in-law, Arthur Chapman, both played first-class cricket.

References

External links
Frederick Ravenhill at ESPNcricinfo
Frederick Ravenhill at CricketArchive

1837 births
1897 deaths
People from Littlehampton
Alumni of Pembroke College, Oxford
English cricketers
Sussex cricketers